Lars Jacob Jack Vreeswijk (born January 25, 1964 in Stockholm) is a Swedish ballad singer, song lyricist and composer. Being son of troubadour Cornelis Vreeswijk, he followed in his father's footsteps and has so far released three albums of his own, often singing his father's songs. He is usually accompanied by guitarist Love Tholin.

In summer 2006, Jack Vreeswijk played in a biographical musical show about his father Från James Dean till Nationalskald (meaning From James Dean to National Bard), on Lundsbrunns Health Resort in Götene. The screenplay was written by him and he also played the lead role as the older Cornelis. The acting was interspersed with songs.

Jack composed music for a film about Cornelis Vreeswijk's life, and produced eight of the tracks on Hans-Erik Dyvik Husbys' album I ljuset av Cornelis (meaning In light of Cornelis). In 2009, he released a tribute album to his father's music titled Jack Vreeswijk sjunger Vreeswijk.

Personal life
Jack Vreeswijk lives in Uddevalla with his wife and two sons Calle and Olle. In 2000, he received the Cornelis Vreeswijk scholarship and in 2008, the Fred Åkerström scholarship.

Discography

Albums

Filmography
2010: Cornelis (composer)

References

External links

Official website
Discogs
Last.fm page

1964 births
Swedish male singers
Living people
20th-century Swedish male singers
21st-century Swedish male singers
Swedish male singer-songwriters
Singers from Stockholm
Swedish people of Dutch descent